Mohammadabad-e Lab-e Rud (also Romanized as Moḩammadābād-e Lab-e Rūd; also known as Moḩammadābād) is a village in Zibad Rural District, Kakhk District, Gonabad County, Razavi Khorasan Province, Iran. At the 2006 census, its population was 51, in 17 families.

References 

Populated places in Gonabad County